Kearby with Netherby is a civil parish in Harrogate district, North Yorkshire, England.  The parish includes the hamlets of Barrowby, Netherby and Kearby Town End.  The parish had a population of 204 in the 2011 census.

Kearby with Netherby was historically a township in the parish of Kirkby Overblow in the West Riding of Yorkshire.  It became a separate civil parish in 1866.  It was transferred to the new county of North Yorkshire in 1974.

Kearby was mentioned in the Domesday Book in 1086, as Cherebi.  The name probably derives from Kærer, an Old Danish personal name.

References 

Civil parishes in North Yorkshire